Frederick Charles Ferdinand, Duke of Brunswick-Lüneburg (5 April 1729 in Brunswick – 27 April 1809 in Glücksburg), was a member of the House of Guelph.  He was a Danish field marshal and also the last Duke of Brunswick-Bevern.

Life 
He was the son of Duke Ernest Ferdinand of Brunswick-Bevern (1682–1746) and his wife, Eleanor Charlotte of Courland.  In 1742, he entered the Dutch army as captain and fought two campaigns in 1745 and 1746.  He then switched to the Brunswick army and also served as a volunteer in the imperial army.  Under the guidance of his uncle Louis Ernest, he commanded the Both'sche regiment during the War of the Austrian Succession.  After the Treaty of Aix-la-Chapelle (1748), returned to the Dutch army, where he was promoted to Major General in 1754.

After the outbreak of the Seven Years' War, he travelled to Dresden at the end of 1756, where King Frederick II of Prussia gave him command of the Saxon infantry regiment Prince Xaver.  However, his soldiers mutinied and ran away and King Frederick held Frederick Charles Ferdinand responsible.  He left the Prussian army in 1759 and joined the British army.  He fought in the Battle of Minden on 1 August 1759 under his cousin Ferdinand.  He then joined the Danish army, where he was promoted to Lieutenant General in 1761 and to Command of the Guards on Foot in 1762 and to Inspector General of the Infantry in 1764.  In 1766, he was appointed governor of Rendsburg and in 1773 governor of Copenhagen.

In 1781, his elder brother August William died and Frederick Charles Ferdinand inherited Brunswick-Bevern and became provost of St. Blaise and the St. Cyriacus Abbey in Brunswick.  However, with permission of the King of Denmark, who promoted him to field marshal in 1782, he took up residence in Glücksburg Castle.

On 26 October 1782, he married Princess Anna Caroline (1751–1824), the daughter of Prince William Henry of Nassau-Saarbrücken and the widow of Duke Frederick Henry William of Schleswig-Holstein-Glücksburg.

In 1793, he created a foundation for poor relief in his capital Bevern.  After Brunswick was occupied by Napoleon's troops in 1806, he took in the sons of Duke Charles William Ferdinand, Duke of Brunswick-Wolfenbüttel.

Frederick Charles Ferdinand died childless in 1809.  With his death, the Brunswick-Bevern line died out, and Brunswick-Bevern fell back to Brunswick-Wolfenbüttel.

Ancestors

References 

 C. Römer, Braunschweig-Bevern, Ein Fürstenhaus als europäische Dynastie 1667 – 1884, Brunswick, 1997, p. 61
 Horst-Rüdiger Jarck and Günter Scheel (eds.), Braunschweigisches Biographisches Lexikon. 19. und 20. Jahrhundert, Hanover, 1996
 

Dukes of Brunswick-Lüneburg
Prussian military personnel of the Seven Years' War
Danish generals
People of the Seven Years' War
1729 births
1809 deaths
18th-century German military personnel
Dutch generals
German military personnel of the War of the Austrian Succession
New House of Brunswick